"You Are Killing Me" is a song by American alternative rock band The Dandy Warhols, released as the sole single from their ninth studio album Distortland (2016).

Composition 

"You Are Killing Me" was described by The A.V. Club as featuring a "sparse arrangement consisting of straightforward, chugging, overdriven guitar, multi-tracked vocals, and slightly off kilter harmonies".

Music video 

The music video features the actor and Warhol superstar, Joe Dallesandro and is seen as a semi-autobiographical story about his alcohol addiction.

Content 

Pryor Stroud of PopMatters described the song as "a straightforward, chomp-rock ballad that glides forward with a spry Magnetic Fields-esque melody".

References

External links 

 

2016 singles
2016 songs
The Dandy Warhols songs
Songs written by Courtney Taylor-Taylor
Black-and-white music videos